Angelo II Acciaioli (15 April 1349 - 31 May 1408) was an Italian Catholic cardinal.

Biography 
Born in Florence, Angelo was elected Bishop of Rapolla in 1375, but in 1383 he was transferred to the see of Florence where he had been preceded by a previous family member many years before, Angelo Acciaioli.  He was promoted to the cardinalate on 17 December 1384 by Pope Urban VI. He defended legality of the election of Urban VI and his successors against the claims of the antipopes Clement VII and Benedict XIII. In the Papal conclave, 1389 he was actively working on being elected to the papacy, but an anonymous narrative of the Conclave accuses him of simony (bribery), managing thereby to acquire six votes of the thirteen cardinals in the Conclave. 

He was legate of Pope Boniface IX in the Kingdom of Naples in 1390 and in Hungary in 1403. As papal legate, Angelo crowned king Ladislaus of Naples in Gaeta on 29 May 1390. He reformed the Benedictine monastery S. Paolo fuori le mura in Rome and participated in the papal conclave, 1404. Newly elected Pope Innocent VII named him archpriest of the patriarchal Vatican Basilica (shortly after 4 December 1404), Cardinal-Bishop of Ostia e Velletri (12 June 1405), Dean of the Sacred College of Cardinals (12 June 1405), and finally Vice-Chancellor of the Holy Roman Church (on 29 August 1405). He presided over the papal conclave, 1406. He died in Pisa at the age of 59. His remains were transferred to the Carthusian monastery in Florence.

In January 1394, King Ladislaus of Naples named him as his bailli and vicar-general for the Principality of Achaea and Lepanto. At the same time, he received the position of Latin Archbishop of Patras.

References

Sources
 
The Florentine church, Archbishop Curia, Florence 1970.

Curzio Ugurgieri della Berardenga, Gli Acciaioli di Firenze nella Luce de' Loro Tempi, Leo Olschki, 1962.
Martin Souchon: Die Papstwahlen in der Zeit des grossen Schismas, Verlag von Benno Goeritz, 1888

Acknowledgment

1349 births
1408 deaths
Angelo 2
Clergy from Florence
15th-century Italian cardinals
Cardinal-bishops of Ostia
Deans of the College of Cardinals
Diplomats of the Holy See
15th-century Italian Roman Catholic bishops
Latin archbishops of Patras
14th-century people from the Principality of Achaea